Pandemic is the debut studio album by American rapper Comethazine, released on March 27, 2020, by Alamo Records.

Promotion

Singles 

 "Glide" was released as the album's first single on September 28, 2019, under the title "Glide Freestyle". A music video accompanied the release of the track.
 "No Front" was released as the album's second single on March 20, 2020, along with a music video.

Track listing

Charts

References

2020 debut albums
Comethazine albums